The phrases "on the bit", "behind the bit" and "above the bit" are equestrian terms used to describe a horse's posture relative to the reins and the bridle bit. A position on the bit is submissive to the rider's rein aids, given through the bit. When a horse is behind the bit, the head is tucked too far down and rearward. If above the bit, then the head is too high.

Technique 
Being on the bit requires the horse to engage the hips and raise the back, which it cannot do when its head is pulled rearward.  The neck is connected to the shoulders, and impeding the shoulders prevents extension of the forehand.  This will cause the horse to hollow its back.
A horse is properly placed, on the bit, by creating impulsion (pushing power) from the rider's driving aids, and then containing this forward energy in the hands, via the reins and bit. Impulsion causes the horse to engage its hind end, lift its back, and finally (when it becomes submissive and accepts contact with the bit, without resistance) results in the horse flexing at the poll, maintaining an elastic contact that is equal on both sides of the bit. The horse stretches over its topline and follows the bit's contact forward and down. Being "on the bit" is more than just a fancy head position; seesawing on the bit causes tension throughout the body. On the bit is synonymous with "on the aids", where the horse is relaxed, using its back and hindquarters, and is responsive to the aids without tension.

As a test, the rider can soften contact, and the horse will maintain the pressure and follow the bit downward. The horse does not have to have its head perfectly perpendicular to the ground; it is acceptable, in dressage tests, to have the nose slightly in front of the vertical.

Common faults 

A horse is not "on the bit" only because its head is held "at the vertical," or perpendicular to the ground, as a horse can maintain this headset while remaining stiff, heavy on the bit, and unresponsive to the rider's aids. The vertical headset is not a guarantee by any means that the animal is truly on the bit, and many novice riders achieve the vertical headset, while losing the impulsion from the horse, because they ride "front to back," or pull the horse's head down in an effort to make the horse appear to be accepting the aids. This is also sometimes seen when the horse is ridden in certain gadgets, such as draw reins, especially if the rider is not skilled enough to correctly use the piece of equipment.

A horse that is on its forehand or unbalanced will not be able to come correctly on the bit, and will usually either lean on the rider's hands, placing too much pressure on the bit, pull against the rider and "root" or else brace upward against rein pressure and come "above the bit". This makes the contact heavy, and the aids can not come "through."

Some horses will avoid contact with the bit, rather than correctly accepting it, and come "behind the bit". This may occur either due to evasion by the horse (so it does not have to listen to the rider) or because the rider is using the bit too strongly or physically trying to pull the horse on the bit. It is a very common fault if the rider "see-saws" on the reins.
Sometimes the horse will have a very strong contact, most commonly if its head is purposefully pulled in by the rider. Additionally, the horse will bring its nose closer to his chest, or "behind the vertical."

The most important test is if the horse will follow the contact forward, and down, if the reins are softened by the rider. If the horse follows, it is so to speak the horse that chooses to touch the rider with its mouth. If this quality of contact is established, the horse is really working on the bit, even if its head is a little in front of or behind the vertical.

Uses 
Horses are required to go on the bit in certain riding disciplines, such as dressage. However, all horses ridden on contact are generally encouraged to go on the bit, as this not only makes them more responsive to the rider's aids, but also allows them to move in a more athletic manner since the animal is raising its back and bringing its hocks further under its body.

References 

Dressage terminology
Riding techniques and movements